"This Missin' You Heart of Mine"  is a song written by Mike Geiger and Woody Mullis, and recorded by American country music group Sawyer Brown.  It was released in November 1987 as the second single from the album Somewhere in the Night.  The song reached No. 2 on the Billboard Hot Country Singles & Tracks chart.

Charts

Weekly charts

Year-end charts

References

1988 singles
1987 songs
Sawyer Brown songs
Song recordings produced by Ron Chancey
Capitol Records Nashville singles
Curb Records singles
Songs written by Mike Geiger
Songs written by Woody Mullis